Ariola ransonneti is a moth of the family Nolidae first described by Felder and Rogenhofer in 1874. It is only known from Sri Lanka.

Taxonomy
Ariola ransonneti was placed as a synonym of Ariola coelisigna in Poole (1989), it is now treated as a valid species.

External links

Chloephorinae
Moths described in 1874
Moths of Sri Lanka